Máximo F. Inocencio (18 November 1833 – 12 September 1896) was a Filipino architect and businessman involved in construction, shipping, trade and lumber. He figured in the 1872 Cavite mutiny and was a supporter of the Philippine Revolution, leading to his execution by the Spaniards in 1896. Consequently, he and the other Filipinos executed came to be known as the Thirteen Martyrs of Cavite.

Early life
Máximo Inocencio was born in Cavite, Cavite. His parents were Ana Marie and Tranquilino Inocencio.  His mother was a direct descendant of the Spanish family Franco. His father was a seaman who made voyages to and from Mexico. He was still a young boy when his father died.
Although one source identifies Inocencio as an architect and a carpenter by profession, little is known about his schooling. He pursued an independent occupation as an apprentice in a carpentry shop of the arsenal in Cavite. He later became a contractor and erected churches, bridges, buildings, and other public works in Cavite. His shop was located at San Roque, employing about 25 men.
His construction company built the Tejeros Bridge, the provincial capitol, the Cavite elementary and high schools, the cathedral and parochial house of San Pedro and the Inocencio mansion La Casa Grande. The company also repaired the church in Naic and the Dominican church in Cavite. He also constructed bancas, cascos and sailboats. He did business with the Spanish Navy and maintained a yard where repairs on small boats were done. Later, he established a sawmill and lumberyard.
He had three sailboats, Dos Hermanos La Luz, Amparo, and Aurea, which he used for hauling logs and transporting firewood from Mindoro, Mariveles, and from as far as Lagingmanok (renamed Padre Burgos), Quezon province.

Cavite Mutiny
Máximo Inocencio had an established business and was a well-known citizen of means when the Cavite Revolt of 1872 took place. Three priests – Mariano Gomez, Jose Burgos, and Jacinto Zamora – were executed on suspicion that they had plotted the mutiny. Artigas y Cuerva stated that Inocencio had nothing to do with this uprising, but because he was a Freemason, he was implicated in it. He was sentenced to 10 years imprisonment and deported to Cartagena, Spain (some historians say he was exiled to Ceuta, a penal colony of Spanish Morocco, Africa).
Inocencio was deported together with Pedro Paraiso and Crisanto de los Reyes. Later on, under the leadership of Paraiso, Inocencio crossed the border to France. From Marseilles, he obtained his pardon and freedom after 10 years in exile.
Back in the Philippines, Inocencio resumed his business activities such as a building and bridge contractor, shipbuilder, sawmill operator, hauler of logs and transporter of firewood from Mindoro, Mariveles, Padre Burgos and Tayabas (now Quezon) Province. He owned three small boats that went to China and Vietnam, bringing back goods to the Philippines. He also regained his social prestige. In 1895, he was one of the members of the junta inspectora of the Hospicio de San Jose in Cavite, an honorary office headed by the parish priest. He was also a proprietor of a large store and was a contractor of the arsenal.

Philippine Revolution
Máximo Inocencio joined the Katipunan and continued to support political causes including the Propaganda Movement abroad. In the Revolution of 1896, he offered his house as a hiding place for Gen. Aguinaldo. The latter used Inocencio's mansion as his headquarters before transferring to Bacoor on July 4, 1898. It was here that Julián Felipe was asked by Aguinaldo to compose a march that would become the Philippine national anthem. Bearing the Hong Kong-made Filipino flag, Aguinaldo left La Casa Grande shortly after lunch on June 12, 1898 and headed to Kawit to proclaim Philippine Independence from the central window of his ancestral home.
The Spanish government began its crackdown on suspected revolutionaries when a seamstress told the governor's wife of her suspicion that Severino Lapidario, Alfonso de Ocampo and Luis Aguado were hatching a plot to overthrow the Spanish government. These three men were arrested, tortured and their statements were the basis of the arrests in the next few days.
Inocencio was implicated together with other prominent citizens of Cavite. In his declaration, Alfonso de Ocampo revealed that Inocencio, Francisco Osorio, Luis Aguado and Severino Lapidario were the leaders of the planned uprising in Cavite. The signal to start the mutiny was to come from fireworks to be shot from Inocencio's camarin or warehouse. This testimony led to Inocencio's arrest on September 4, 1896.
The Spaniards confiscated all of his wealth and made the family evacuate their home because he was accused of funding the revolution. This accusation was true.

Thirteen Martyrs of Cavite

He was among 13 Caviteños, headed by Lapidario, who were found guilty of rebellion on September 11, 1896 after a hasty trial lasting only four hours. The families of the 13 Caviteños were not informed of the verdict.
At 12:45 p.m. the following day, the 13 patriots were brought out of their cells and taken to the Plaza de Armas outside Fort San Felipe, made to line up, kneel facing the wall, their hands tied at their back and executed by musketry.
At age 63, Maximo was the oldest of the 13.
Their bodies were buried in a common grave at the Catholic cemetery at the village of Caridad. Later, the bodies of seven of the martyrs, including Máximo Inocencio, were exhumed and reburied elsewhere. The rest remained unclaimed in the common grave. Máximo Inocencio's remains were sepulchered in a niche at the Porta Vaga Church then later transferred to the San Agustin Church in Intramuros.
The execution was a warning to discourage the spread of the uprising but in a week, all the towns in Cavite rose up in arms.

Legacy
It is said of Inocencio that “with chisel and hammer he worked his way to wealth amassing one of the largest fortunes in the province.” He had been variously described as a diligent and hard worker, and a charitable citizen who did not fail to lend a helping hand to the needy.
He had nine children by his wife, Doña Narcisa Francisco, four of whom reached maturity. One of his granddaughters, Amalia Inocencio Jaime, married the war hero Gen. Benito Alejandrino Natividad.
Unfortunately, many of his projects were destroyed by aerial bombing during World War II, among them the Cavite provincial government building, the former provincial high school, the cathedral and parochial house of San Pedro and La Casa Grande.
The city of Trece Martires in Cavite is named after the thirteen martyrs. There are life size statues of Don Máximo Inocencio and the other martyrs in a memorial erected in their honour.

In popular culture
 Portrayed by Soliman Cruz in the 2012 film, El Presidente.

References

Industrious Men by Ignacio Villamor, pp. 48–49
Eminent Filipinos by Carlos Quirino, pp. 129–130
Cavite's “Trece Martires” Remembered by Luz Rimban (1996 Newspaper article)
Eminent Filipinos. Manila: National Historical Commission, Saulo, Alfredo B. and Esteban A. De Ocampo
History of Cavite. Trece Martires City: Provincial Government of Cavite, 1985
The History and Cultural Life of Cavite, published by MEC, Division of Cavite and Cavite Provincial Government, 1981
Zaide, Gregorio. Great Filipinos in History. Manila: Verde Bookstore, 1970
Liping Kabitenyo by Emmanuel Franco Calairo, 1999, pp. 109-110

People of the Philippine Revolution
1833 births
1896 deaths
Filipino Freemasons
People from Cavite City
Burials at San Agustin Church (Manila)